Madeleine Angela Clinton-Baddeley, CBE (4 July 1904 – 22 February 1976) was an English stage and television actress, best-remembered for her role as household cook Mrs. Bridges in the period drama Upstairs, Downstairs. Her stage career lasted more than six decades.

Early life
Madeleine Angela Clinton-Baddeley was born in West Ham, Essex (now London) in 1904 into a wealthy family, she would later base the character of Mrs. Bridges on one of the cooks her family employed. Her younger sister was actress Hermione Baddeley.

In 1912, Angela and Hermione enrolled as pupils at Margaret Morris's dancing school in Chelsea. Angela described the school as "a wonderful foundation for all my work on the stage." In the same year, the eight-year old Angela made her stage début at the Dalston Palace of Varieties, Dalston, in a play called The Dawn of Happiness. When she was nine, she auditioned at the Old Vic Theatre. In November 1915 she made her début at the Old Vic in Richard III, and she subsequently appeared in many other Shakespeare plays.

During her teenage years, the "consummate little actress", as a national newspaper had once called her when she was 10, starred in many musicals and pantomimes. She briefly 'retired' from acting at age 18. Her first marriage, to Stephen Thomas, produced one daughter. On 8 July 1929 she married actor/stage director Glen Byam Shaw; they had two children, a son and a daughter.

After spending some time in Australia touring Barrie comedies, Baddeley established herself as a popular stage actress. At the beginning of the 1930s she appeared in two films, the Sherlock Holmes tale, The Speckled Band (1931), featuring Raymond Massey as Sir Arthur Conan Doyle's sleuth, and in The Ghost Train (also 1931), a screen version of the successful stage thriller. Throughout the 1940s, she played many strong female roles on stage, including Miss Prue in Love for Love and Nora in The Winslow Boy.

Later years
She played the bawd in Tony Richardson's production of Pericles, Prince of Tyre at the Shakespeare Memorial Theatre in 1958. She played Mistress Quickly in several episodes of the BBC Shakespeare history series An Age of Kings (1960), performing with her sister Hermione as Doll Tearsheet. In the original version of Upstairs, Downstairs (1971–75) she played Mrs. Kate Bridges, the resident cook at 165 Eaton Place, who, when the show ended, married the butler, Mr. Angus Hudson (Gordon Jackson). A spin-off series featuring the characters’ married life failed to materialise due to Baddeley's death. After the series ended, Baddeley replaced Hermione Gingold in the original London production of A Little Night Music.

She received a CBE in 1975 for "services to the theatre". She died at Grayshott Hall in 1976 from influenza and bronchitis aged 71, shortly after Upstairs, Downstairs ended its run.

Family
She was the grandmother of Charles Hart, lyricist of the Andrew Lloyd Webber musical, The Phantom of the Opera. She was the sister of actress Hermione Baddeley.

Filmography

References

External links
 
 
 Performances in the Theatre Archive University of Bristol
 

1904 births
1976 deaths
Actresses from London
Commanders of the Order of the British Empire
English stage actresses
English television actresses
Deaths from pneumonia in England
20th-century British actresses
People from Grayshott
20th-century English women
20th-century English people
20th-century British businesspeople